The Oklahoma State University System is a university system comprising six educational institutes across Oklahoma: four general academic universities and two health institutions. Its flagship institute is the Oklahoma State University–Stillwater.  The Oklahoma State University System has a total enrollment of about 34,568 students and is the largest university in the state of Oklahoma with an annual budget of $1.5 billion. The System also has Agricultural Experiment Stations throughout Oklahoma and Cooperative Extension offices that serve all 77 counties.

General universities 
 Oklahoma State University–Stillwater (flagship campus, also see Stillwater, Oklahoma)
 Oklahoma State University Institute of Technology (also see Okmulgee, Oklahoma)
 Oklahoma State University–Oklahoma City (also see Oklahoma City, Oklahoma)
 Oklahoma State University–Tulsa (also see Tulsa, Oklahoma)

Health institutes 
 Oklahoma State University Center for Health Sciences (also see Tulsa, Oklahoma)
 Oklahoma State University Medical Center (also see Tulsa, Oklahoma)

References

External links
 
 Oklahoma A&M College Board of Regents website

 
O